Xylosandrus crassiusculus, known generally as the Asian ambrosia beetle or granulate ambrosia beetle, is a species of tropical bark beetle in the family Curculionidae. It is native to Asia and has spread to Africa, Europe, Australasia and the Americas.

Distribution and habitat
This beetle is native to Asia, and has spread to other parts of the world as an invasive species in Africa, the Americas, Europe and Oceania. It was first reported in the southeastern United States in 1974, had reached Costa Rica by 1996, Panama by 2003, and Guatemala and northern Brazil by 2008. It appeared in Argentina in 2001, nearly a decade before it was detected in southern Brazil and Uruguay; as the latter two countries were vigilant, with long-term trapping programmes, the Argentine collection may represent a direct introduction from a non-American source, with the insects later spreading northwards up the coast.

Life cycle
Females mate with their siblings before leaving the galleries. Although males are flightless, females can fly and disperse to other potential host trees. Here they excavate tunnels and lay eggs. The larvae develop and enlarge the galleries and the female stays with the brood, overwintering there.

Ecology
Although the larvae of ambrosia beetles develop in cavities in wood, the food of both adults and larvae is exclusively a symbiotic fungus which the female beetle introduces into the tunnels and galleries she excavates. In the case of Xylosandrus crassiusculus, the fungus has been identified as Ambrosiella roeperi. It has been shown that the beetle is attracted to the smell of this fungus, which may concentrate attacks on specific trees.

This beetle is polyphagous, infesting many species of host trees. It is usually restricted to stressed young trees and nursery stock, but sometimes attacks apparently healthy young trees. It additionally infests stacked timber, where it causes economic damage. In the United States, trees and shrubs infested include oak, cherry and crape myrtle, as well as pecan, peach, plum, persimmon, elm, sweet gum, magnolia, fig, buckeye and sweet potato. In Europe its host is the carob (Ceratonia siliqua), while in Israel, where the carob grows, its only known host is the Palestine oak (Quercus calliprinos).

Host plants

 Acacia decurrens
 Acacia mangium
 Acrocarpus
 Adina rubescens
 Adinandra dumosa
 Adinobotrys atropurpureus
 Afzelia bipindensis
 Agathis
 Albizia chinensis
 Albizia ferruginea
 Albizia gummifera
 Albizia lebbek
 Albizia stipulata
 Albizia zygia
 Allaeanthus luzonicus
 Alnus 
 Alstonia
 Altingia excelsa
 Amoora
 Angylocalyx pynaertii
 Anisoptera
 Anthonotha fragrans
 Antiaris africana
 Antrocaryon micraster
 Artocarpus chaplasha
 Aucoumea klaineana
 Barteria nigritiana
 Bauhinia tomentosa
 Bischofia javanica
 Buchanania arborescens
 Buchanania sessilifolia
 Calamus
 Calophyllum tetrapterum
 Camellia sinensis
 Canarium
 Cannabis sativa
 Carapa procera
 Carica papaya
 Carya illinoinensis
 Caryota 
 Castanea argentea
 Castanea javanica
 Castanopsis
 Castilla elastica
 Casuarina equisetifolia
 Cecropia 
 Cedrela toona
 Ceiba pentandra
 Ceiba thonningii
 Celtis brownii
 Celtis mildbraedii
 Celtis zenkeri
 Chlorophora excelsa
 Chloroxylon swietenia
 Chrysophyllum
 Cinchona
 Cinnamomum camphora
 Cistanthera
 Cleistopholis patens
 Coelocaryon preussii
 Coffea robusta
 Cylicodiscus gabunensis
 Cynometra hankie
 Dacryodes pubescens
 Dactylocladus stenostachya
 Dalbergia latifolia
 Dalbergia sissoo
 Dialium corbisieri
 Dialium pachyphyllum
 Dillenia pentagyna
 Dimocarpus longan
 Dipterocarpus baudii
 Distemonanthus benthamianus
 Doona zeylanica
 Dryobalanops
 Drypetes leonensis
 Elaeis guineensis
 Elaeocarpus sericeus
 Elaeocarpus tetrapterum
 Elaeocarpus tuberculatus
 Entandrophragma angolense
 Entandrophragma cylindricum
 Entandrophragma utile
 Erythrina lithosperma
 Erythrophleum guineense
 Eucalyptus deglupta
 Eucalyptus robusta
 Eugenia caryophyllus
 Eugenia jambolana
 Eupatorium pallescens
 Fagara macrophylla
 Fagus crenata
 Falcataria moluccana
 Ficus
 Fleroya stipulosa
 Garcinia polyantha
 Garcinia punctata
 Gliricidia maculate
 Gluta tourtour
 Gluta travancorica
 Gluta usitata
 Gmelina arborea
 Gossweilerondendron balsamiferum
 Grevillea robusta
 Guarea cedrata
 Guarea laurentii
 Hannoa klaineana
 Haronga paniculata
 Hevea brasiliensis
 Holigarna arnottiana
 Hopea beccariana
 Hopea ferrea
 Hopea odorata
 Hopea parviflora
 Hopea wightiana
 Julbernardia seretii
 Khaya ivorensis
 Kayea floribunda
 Koompassia malaccensis
 Lagerstroemia speciosa
 Lannea grandis
 Lasiococca 
 Lecaniodiscus cupanioides
 Leea crispa
 Leea sambucina
 Lithocarpus wallichiana
 Lophira procera
 Lovoa klaineana
 Lovoa trichilioides
 Luffa
 Macaranga monandra
 Machilus odoratissima
 Macrolobium macrophyllum
 Malus pumila
 Mangifera indica
 Mansonia altissima
 Melochia umbellata
 Microcos coriacea
 Microcos pinnatifida
 Murraya koenigii
 Musanga cecropioides
 Myrianthus arboreus
 Myristica dactyloides
 Napoleonaea imperialis
 Nauclea diderrichii
 Ochthocosmus africanus
 Octomeles sumatrana
 Ongokea gore
 Pachylobus barteri
 Palaquium gutta
 Pancovia laurentii
 Parinari kerstingii
 Parishia 
 Parkia bicolor
 Pithecellobium lobatum
 Piptadeniastrum africanum
 Protium pittieri
 Pycnanthus angolensis
 Quercus serrata
 Randia congolana
 Ricinodendron heudelotii
 Saccharum officinarum
 Sagraea laurina
 Sapium 
 Scorodophloeus zenkeri
 Shorea guiso
 Shorea macroptera
 Shorea robusta
 Sindora 
 Staudtia stipitata
 Sterculia macrophylla
 Sterculia oblonga
 Sterculia villosa
 Strombosia glaucescens
 Strombosiopsis tetrandra
 Styrax benzoin
 Swietenia macrophylla
 Synsepalum subcordatum
 Tectona grandis
 Terminalia ivorensis
 Terminalia superba
 Terminalia tomentosa
 Tessmannia africana
 Tessmannia anomala
 Tetrapleura 
 Thalia geniculata
 Thea sinensis
 Theobroma cacao
 Topobea maurofernandeziana
 Trichilia heudelotii
 Trichilia prieureana
 Triplochiton scleroxylon
 Turraeanthus africana
 Vernonia arborea
 Vernonia conferta
 Vochysia ferruginea
 Xanthophyllum affine

References

Further reading

External links

 

Scolytinae
Beetles of Africa
Beetles of Asia
Beetles of Central America
Beetles of Europe
Beetles of North America
Beetles of Oceania
Beetles of South America
Insect pests of temperate forests
Insect pests of tropical forests
Taxa named by Victor Motschulsky
Beetles described in 1866
Articles created by Qbugbot